Nina Hansen (born 8 May 1942) is a Danish athlete. She competed in the women's long jump at the 1964 Summer Olympics.

References

1942 births
Living people
Athletes (track and field) at the 1964 Summer Olympics
Athletes (track and field) at the 1968 Summer Olympics
Danish female long jumpers
Danish pentathletes
Olympic athletes of Denmark
Place of birth missing (living people)